Jonathan Levin Kolangui (born 6 May 1993) is a Mexican professional footballer who plays as a midfielder. He is Jewish.

See also
List of select Jewish football (association; soccer) players

References

External links

1993 births
Living people
Footballers from Mexico City
Mexican footballers
Mexican expatriate footballers
C.F. Pachuca players
Club Puebla players
Chiapas F.C. footballers
C.D. Veracruz footballers
FC Tulsa players
Las Vegas Lights FC players
Phoenix Rising FC players
Association football midfielders
Expatriate soccer players in the United States
USL Championship players
Mexican Jews
Jewish footballers
Mexican expatriate sportspeople in the United States